Shor Shoreh (also known as Showr Showreh and Shūr Shūreh) is a village in Sang Sefid Rural District, Qareh Chay District, Khondab County, Markazi Province, Iran. At the 2006 census, its population was 199, in 45 families.

References 

Populated places in Khondab County